Park Ridge is a city in Cook County, Illinois, United States, and a Chicago suburb. Per the 2020 census, the population was 39,656. It is close to O'Hare International Airport, major expressways, and rail transportation. It is a part of the Chicago metropolitan area, bordering three official neighborhoods on Chicago's Far Northwest Side (Edison Park, Norwood Park, and O'Hare.)

The soil is abundant with clay deposits, which made it a brick-making center for the developing city of Chicago. Park Ridge was originally called Pennyville to honor George Penny, the businessman who owned the local brickyard along with Robert Meacham. Later it was named Brickton. The Des Plaines River divides Park Ridge from neighboring Des Plaines, Illinois, which is west of Park Ridge. Chicago is south and east of Park Ridge, and Niles and unincorporated Maine Township are to its north.

History

The area of Park Ridge was inhabited by the Potawatomie until they were removed in 1833. The area was a convenient portage between the Des Plaines and Chicago rivers for the French explorers and in the early 1830s, the first settlers arrived from New England and New York. In 1854 George Penny established a brickworks in the area. Due to the brickwork and the abundance of clay, Park Ridge was nicknamed "Brickton" by locals. In 1910 Park Ridge had a population of 2,009. In 1930 the population was 10,417. In 1950 the population was 16,602. In 1960 the population was 32,625, with 99.9% of the population white. There were five African-Americans and 31 people classed other than black or white. By 1970, the population had risen to 42,466. In 2016, graduate of the first class of Park Ridge's Maine Township High School South (1965) former First Lady Hillary Rodham Clinton, campaigned as the Democratic candidate for President of the United States.

Geography

Climate 

Park Ridge falls under the USDA 5b Plant Hardiness zone.

Demographics
As of the 2020 census there were 39,656 people, 14,384 households, and 10,323 families residing in the city. The racial makeup of the city was 86.10% White, 4.87% Asian, 0.53% African American, 0.16% Native American, 0.01% Pacific Islander, 1.82% from other races, and 6.51% from two or more races. Hispanic or Latino of any race were 7.20% of the population.

There were 14,384 households, out of which 60.27% had children under the age of 18 living with them, 59.61% were married couples living together, 9.94% had a female householder with no husband present, and 28.23% were non-families. 25.27% of all households were made up of individuals, and 13.29% had someone living alone who was 65 years of age or older. The average household size was 3.11 and the average family size was 2.56.

The city's age distribution consisted of 23.5% under the age of 18, 5.7% from 18 to 24, 20.5% from 25 to 44, 29.9% from 45 to 64, and 20.3% who were 65 years of age or older. The median age was 45.2 years. For every 100 females, there were 95.3 males. For every 100 females age 18 and over, there were 91.9 males.

The median income for a household in the city was $113,809, and the median income for a family was $145,995. Males had a median income of $82,222 versus $51,371 for females. The per capita income for the city was $58,978. About 2.4% of families and 3.9% of the population were below the poverty line, including 3.0% of those under age 18 and 3.8% of those age 65 or over.

Note: the US Census treats Hispanic/Latino as an ethnic category. This table excludes Latinos from the racial categories and assigns them to a separate category. Hispanics/Latinos can be of any race.

Education 
 

Park Ridge is served by the Park Ridge-Niles School District 64, which has its headquarters in the Raymond E. Hendee Educational Service Center in Park Ridge. Area middle schools include Lincoln Middle School and Emerson Middle School in Niles. At one point there were nine public K–6 elementary schools: Oakton, Madison, Edison, Merrill, Carpenter, Field, Franklin, Roosevelt, and Washington. Only the latter five remain today, and all are in Park Ridge.  Jefferson School is also part of the district and houses the special needs preschool for children ages 3 and 4, the extended day kindergarten program, and the after school program for grades K–6.

St. Paul of the Cross and Mary Seat of Wisdom are the two Catholic elementary schools. St. Andrews is a Lutheran elementary school.

The town is served by Maine Township High School District 207, which includes Maine South High School, and Maine East High School. Students who live in northern Park Ridge have the option of attending either Maine East or Maine South. Maine West High School is located to the west in Des Plaines. Maine North High School was a school in unincorporated Maine Township and part of Maine Township High School District 207. It closed in 1981 as the student population of Maine Township shrank.

District 207 shares student-run radio and television stations operating with the call letters WMTH-FM (W Maine Township High).  Actor Harrison Ford, known for his roles in the Indiana Jones, Star Wars, and Blade Runner movies, went to Maine East, and has been credited as being the radio station's first sports announcer. Since 2007, WMTH Radio can be heard live on any of the district high school homepage.

The town is a part of the Oakton Community College district.

Athletics

Park Ridge is home to the Park Ridge Falcons, the 2002 Pop Warner Football Tomlin Division Pee Wee National Champions.

Park Ridge is home to three American Youth Football National Champions (2006, 2007, 2009) and one American Youth Cheerleading National Champion (2007).

The Maine South Hawks football team were State Champions in 1995, 2000, 2008, 2009, 2010 and 2016, and Runners-up in 2003, 2004, 2005, and 2021.

Economy

Top employers
According to Park Ridge's 2020 Comprehensive Annual Financial Report, the top employers in the city were:

Notable people 

Park Ridge is the hometown of Hillary Rodham Clinton. When she visited Park Ridge on the occasion of her 50th birthday in 1997, the city renamed the southeast corner of the intersection of Elm and Wisner streets, next to her childhood home, "Rodham Corner". Clinton graduated from Maine Township High School South, a new school built to accommodate the population of baby boomers coming through at the time.

Park Ridge is also the hometown of movie stars Carrie Snodgress, Karen Black, Suzanne Snyder and Harrison Ford. All four attended Maine Township High School East. Sean Giambrone also grew up in Park Ridge. He is most notable for his role in The Goldbergs as Adam. He went to Lincoln Middle School and Maine South High School.

The first U.S. citizen to be canonized, Mother Frances Cabrini, attended St. Paul of the Cross Church and owned a farm at the north edge of Park Ridge.

Actor Harrison Ford, known for his roles in the Indiana Jones, Star Wars, and Blade Runner movies, went to Maine East, and has been credited as being the radio station's first sports announcer.

James Pankow, a trombone player, songwriter, composer, and brass instrument player, best known as a founding member of the rock band Chicago.

Artist Grant Wood once owned a shop in Park Ridge, and he lived in Park Ridge.

Sister city
Park Ridge has one sister city:
Kinver, Staffordshire, England

Culture

Landmarks

Park Ridge's most recognizable landmark is the Pickwick Theatre, an Art Deco building dating back to 1928. It is a movie theater and a venue for plays and concerts. In 1975, the theater was named to the National Register of Historic Places. Although smaller theaters have been added to the rear of the building, the main auditorium theater remains intact in its original large five-aisle state. The main auditorium can seat up to 1,400 people. In the 1980s, the Pickwick's facade was one of many used as the backdrop for the opening credits of Gene Siskel and Roger Ebert's At the Movies. Up until 2017, it also had a restaurant next door.
Park Ridge Public Library.
City of Park Ridge Historic Preservation Commission's Historic Landmarks and 100 Year-Old Homes

In popular culture

In film
The 1980 film The Blues Brothers had some scenes filmed in Park Ridge. The scenes where the brothers were first pulled over by the state police and the beginning of the subsequent chase were filmed there. The Nelson Funeral Home and Shell gas station which the brothers drove past as the police pulled out to intercept them are still in business at the intersection of Talcott and Cumberland avenues. The brothers were pulled over at the intersection of Cumberland and Gillick. As the chase progressed, a trooper radioed that the chase was "proceeding on Courtland Avenue". The scene where the Blues Brothers and the police spun out in a three-way intersection occurred at the intersection of Devon Avenue, Talcott Road, and Courtland Avenue.
In the 1990 film Home Alone, Buzz McCallister wears a Maine South High School letterman's jacket.
The curved-shaped house appears several times in the TV police drama Crime Story that was set in 1963. Actor Jon Polito played Chicago crime boss Phil Bartoli in the series, who owned the Park Ridge house in the episodes. The series debuted in 1986 on NBC.
Ray Luca (actor Anthony Denison) and Pauli Taglia (John Santucci) exit the Park Ridge house on Dee Road.  Luca tells Taglia to get in the car and drive. Luca, happy with the meeting with the national crime boss and his sudden rise in power within the mob organization, sits in the passenger seat, smiling as Pauli drives through Park Ridge. During the drive Luca says, "we’re there, Pauli, it’s happening." Pauli, confused as he's driving, he was not at the meeting, says "where? We’re in Park Ridge, nothing happens in Park Ridge." 
Todd Stiles (actor Martin Milner) and Buzz Murdock (George Maharis) are seen exiting a building labeled "Park Ridge Medical Center" in the TV series Route 66. The medical facility was located at the southwest corner of Talcott and Canfield. The scene appears in Season 3, Episode 5, titled "Voice at the end of the line." The scene continues as they walk toward the corner of Yost and Canfield where several Park Ridge houses on Yost are in view.

Later in the episode ("Voice at the end of the line") Todd and Buzz park their 1962 Corvette in front of a white house located at the northeast corner of Prospect and Stewart avenues. The large multi-story house was used as a boarding house in the episode. The duo are seen walking from the car to the boarding house's front door. A different camera angle shows houses on the west side of Prospect. Several minutes later Todd and Buzz are filmed exiting the house, walking to the Vette. A later camera angle shows the Corvette, Todd and Buzz talking to a cab driver and the Park Ridge house in the background.

References

External links

City of Park Ridge official website
Park Ridge Public Library
Park Ridge Community Network, from Park Ridge Public Library
A history of Park Ridge, Illinois

 
Cities in Illinois
Cities in Cook County, Illinois
Populated places established in 1873
1873 establishments in Illinois